The following are events of the year 1961 in Denmark.

Incumbents
 Monarch – Frederick IX
 Prime minister – Viggo Kampmann

Events
 28 March – The Danish Maritime and Commercial Court is created by act.

Sports

Badminton
 1417 March  All England Badminton Championships
 Erland Kops wins gold in Men's Single
 Finn Kobberø and Jørgen Hammergaard Hansen win gold in Men's Double
 Finn Kobberø and Kirsten Thorndahl win gold medal in Mixed Double.

Sports

Badminton
 1416 March  All England Badminton Championships
 Erland Kops wins gold in Men's Single
 Finn Kobberø and Kirsten Thorndahl win gold medal in Mixed Double.

Births
 28 May – Frank Jensen, politician, lord mayor of Copenhagen
 19 November – Pernille Svarre, athlete

Deaths
 6 June – Frants Nielsen, sport shooter, competitor at the 1912 Summer Olympics (born 1874)
 18 September – Hans Denver, sport shooter, competitor at the 1912 and 1920 Summer Olympics (born 1876)
 20 December
 Johannes Larsen, nature painter (born 1867)
 Johan Frederik Steffensen, mathematician, statistician and actuary, professor of actuarial science at the University of Copenhagen 1923–43 (born 1873)

See also
1961 in Danish television

References

 
Denmark
Years of the 20th century in Denmark
1960s in Denmark